People's University is a private university located at Bhopal, Madhya Pradesh, India. It was established in 2011.

History 
People's University was established on 4 May 2011 through the Madhya Pradesh Niji Vishwavidyalay(Sthapana Ewam Sanchalan) Sanshodhan Adhiniyam, 2011, which also established Oriental University and ITM University.

Constituent institutes 
The university includes the following constituent institutes:
 People's College of Medical Sciences and Research Centre
 People's College of Dental Sciences & Research Centre
 People's Dental Academy
 School of Research & Technology
 People's Institute Of Management & Research
 People's Institute of Hotel Management, Catering Technology & Applied Nutrition
 School Of Pharmacy & Research
 People's College Of Paramedical Science And Research Centre
 People's College Of Nursing & Research Centre

References

External links

Private universities in India
Educational institutions established in 2011
2011 establishments in Madhya Pradesh